Chaos A.D. is the fifth studio album by Brazilian heavy metal band Sepultura, released in 1993 by Roadrunner Records. The album saw a stylistic departure from the band's earlier thrash metal style, by featuring a new groove metal sound. Chaos A.D. is also Sepultura's only album on Epic Records, who handled its release for North American distribution, as well as the first album to feature Paulo Jr. on bass after having played with the band in a live capacity since 1984.

Production
The band considered a number of producers, including avant-garde jazz composer John Zorn and Al Jourgensen of industrial metal pioneers Ministry. They ultimately chose Andy Wallace, who had previously mixed Arise. Sepultura wanted isolation, and for that Andy Wallace suggested Rockfield Studios, located in South Wales. The recording sessions marked the first time Sepultura had recorded as a quartet as opposed to a trio, which saw Andreas Kisser handling both bass and guitar duties on their previous three albums; as such, Chaos A.D. was the first album to include Paulo Jr., who had been playing live with the band since joining in 1984.

"Kaiowas" was recorded live among the ruins of the medieval castle of Chepstow. It was an entirely acoustic track, with Kisser and Max Cavalera on the guitars and drummer Igor Cavalera and Paulo Jr. on percussion. When they recorded "Kaiowas", the quartet never even considered playing the track live, because they thought it would be too difficult to recreate the drumming on stage. They changed their minds after seeing a video of the American band Neurosis: "We saw in that live video that the Neurosis guys put down their guitars and everybody started to play the drums on stage", lead guitarist Andreas remembers. "We decided to try the same thing. We rehearsed it once and it was wonderful. We haven't stopped playing the song live since."

During recording sessions, Sepultura recorded a number of covers: "The Hunt", from New Model Army, "Polícia", from Titãs, "Inhuman Nature", from the American hardcore punk band Final Conflict, and "Crucificados pelo Sistema", from Brazilian Ratos de Porão. Igor, a New Model Army fan, convinced the other band members to include "The Hunt" on the record. Paulo joked that the money of the LP would go straight to new dentures for Justin Sullivan, the toothless singer of New Model Army. The latter 3 covers would be included as B-sides and also on the compilation Blood-Rooted. "Polícia" is also included as a bonus track on the Brazilian edition of the album. Up until the time the album was due, the title was originally Propaganda after track 6, but Max Cavalera changed it to Chaos A.D. after the Misfits' Earth A.D.

Musical style
Out of the boredom of playing the Arise songs for two years straight and concerned about the threat of musically stagnating, Sepultura pushed the envelope on Chaos A.D. The first track, "Refuse/Resist", revealed the band's new musical direction: slower, with more emphasis on groove than speed. The song starts with the heartbeat of Max's then-unborn first son, Zyon, followed by some Afro-Brazilian drumming reminiscent of Salvador, Bahia samba-reggae group Olodum. About the track's introductory guitar riff, Max acknowledged that it "could have been created by a death metal band." Chaos A.D. was their first record to utilize some lower guitar tunings. Half of the songs in the album are tuned down to D standard, except for "Kaiowas", which is in drop C tuning.

Diversity was the key to Chaos A.D., revealed Max Cavalera. "Biotech Is Godzilla" was "pure hardcore", according to the elder Cavalera. "Nomad", with its characteristically slow riffs, was described by lead guitarist Andreas Kisser as their answer to Metallica's "Sad but True". The album also featured Sepultura's first all-acoustic incursion, "Kaiowas". "It's like a mixture of Led Zeppelin, Sonic Youth and Olodum", said Max of that particular song. Dazed & Confused magazine stated the album "signalled a move away from the [Sepultura]'s thrash roots, focusing on slower, industrial grooves." Decibel also acknowledged the departure from Sepultura's thrash metal style on Chaos A.D. In the book The 100 Greatest Metal Guitarists, author Joel McIver stated the album showed a "movement away from extreme metal to a more punk sound" with a stronger focus on "feel and groove". McIver went on to state that the album showed the first signs of the groove metal genre that Sepultura would apply by the mid-1990s. In Ian Christe's book Sound of the Beast, he credits Chaos A.D, along with American heavy metal band Pantera, for developing the death metal-influenced music of groove metal that would later influence other artists in the '90s.

Themes
The lyrics of "Refuse/Resist" mention "tanks on the streets, confronting police, bleeding the plebs." Its chorus ("Refuse! Resist!") resembles a protest march slogan, and when released as a single featured a photograph of a South Korean student rushing at Seoul's riot police contingent while holding a Molotov cocktail. The next song, "Territory", dealt with the conflict between the Palestinian and Israeli peoples. "Slave New World" — with its lyrics co-written by Biohazard bassist Evan Seinfeld — was a protest against censorship.

Massacres were a major part of Chaos A.D.s overall theme. "Amen" tackled the massacre of David Koresh's followers in Waco, Texas. "Manifest" had a faux-radio report of the Carandiru massacre, and "Kaiowas" was made in honor of a Brazilian Indian tribe that committed collective suicide in protest against the government that wanted to drive them off the land of their ancestors. "Nomad", written by Andreas, talked about people expelled from their homelands.

In 2008, speaking to Kerrang!, Max Cavalera remembered: "This certainly got in touch with the dark side of Sepultura. "Refuse/Resist" is an anti-police song – a real piece of anarchy. You could call the album riot music. It was full of heavy shit and some of it was risky, but it was just where we were coming from at the time. "Manifest" is also very close to me. That's about a massacre of prisoners by police at a jail in São Paulo. One hundred and eleven prisoners were killed, and one of my friends was there and took pictures of it all, one of which we used in the artwork."

On Chaos A.D., Sepultura honored one of their biggest idols, Jello Biafra. Max had called Biafra asking him to contribute to the album with a song about the growing neo-Nazi movement. "I asked for something like 'Nazi Punks Fuck Off - Part 2'", remembers Max, referring to the anti-Nazi song "Nazi Punks Fuck Off" by the Dead Kennedys. But Biafra wasn't interested in recycling old ideas and he suggested a song called "Biotech Is Godzilla", that he had written during his visit to Eco '92, a world conference about ecology organized in Rio de Janeiro. "Jello spent ten minutes explaining me his crazy theories", said Max to Anamaria G. of Bizz magazine, "he said that George Bush had sent a group of scientists to Brazil to test germs and bacteria on human beings and use them as guinea pigs. The lyrics claim that biotechnology created AIDS. But they don't say that technology is bad, just that it's in the wrong hands."

Touring and promotion
By the time Chaos A.D. arrived, Sepultura were the biggest act of Roadrunner's roster. Aware of the band's increasing popularity, the label spent nearly $1 million on a "marketing blitz" which quickly guaranteed them silver and gold records in Belgium, France and the UK. The group also signed an exclusive distribution deal with a major label, Epic Records, home of Pearl Jam and Rage Against the Machine. This deal eventually went sour: Epic paid little attention to Sepultura, preferring to invest in Fight and Prong, groups that were, in the long run, less successful than the Brazilians.

The Chaos A.D. tour launched on October 23, 1993, with British doom metal band Paradise Lost as the opening act. The tour went well, except for an incident where Berlin's police received a false tip claiming that Sepultura's tour bus was loaded with a major cocaine shipment. Enraged by the unjust search and seizure procedure, Max re-wrote "Antichrist", from their 1985 Bestial Devastation EP, as "Anti-Cop", and then the band proceeded in playing the song live throughout the tour (a recorded version is available on the combined re-release of Bestial Devastation/Morbid Visions and The Roots of Sepultura albums).

While touring Europe, rumors floated around that Sepultura would be part of the latest edition of Brazil's Hollywood Rock music festival, taking place in January 1994. The event would happen simultaneously on São Paulo and in Rio de Janeiro. Chaos A.D. has sold more than 1.5 million copies worldwide.

The North American leg, which was co-headlined by Pantera, coincided with the 1994 FIFA World Cup, with the concert in Irvine, California, taking place on July 17, a few hours after the tournament final, in nearby Pasadena. Sepultura, whose members attended the match, took to the stage decorated in the Brazilian colors in celebration of the national team's triumph in the tournament.

Critical reception

Chaos A.D. received positive reviews from music critics, with many commending the album's experimentation and sense of the band coming into their own. AllMusic declared it one of the best heavy metal albums of all time, calling it "a remarkable achievement not only in its concentrated power and originality, but also in the degree to which Sepultura eclipsed their idols in offering a vision of heavy metal's future." Entertainment Weekly proclaimed that "Sepultura will separate casual headbangers from rabid addicts fast... even nonmetalheads will be impressed by the variety in [Chaos A.D.]: they're not averse to slowing things down."

In 2017, it was ranked 29th on Rolling Stone's "100 Greatest Metal Albums of All Time".

Track listing

Notes
The original release contained a hidden track (laughter outtakes from "We Who Are Not as Others") after "Clenched Fist".
"Territory" and "Amen/Inner Self" were recorded live in Minneapolis in March 1994.

Personnel
Max Cavalera – vocals, rhythm guitar, 4-string guitar, nylon string guitar
Igor Cavalera – drums, percussion
Paulo Jr. – bass, floor tom
Andreas Kisser – lead guitar, 12-strings viola, steel-string acoustic guitar
Silvio Bibika – studio roadie
Simon Dawson – assistant engineer
Alex Newport – guitar sound, feedback advisor
Dave Somers – assistant engineer
Andy Wallace – producer, mixing
George Marino – mastering
Steve Remote - recording engineer
Michael Whelan – cover artwork ("Cacophony")
Gary Monroe – photography
Recorded at Rockfield Studios, South Wales (though the liner notes incorrectly state "South Wales, England")
"Kaiowas" recorded at Chepstow Castle, Wales
Mixed at The Wool Hall Recording Studios, Bath, England

Charts

Certifications

Notes

References

Works cited
 Korolenk, Jason (2014), Relentless: Thirty Years of Sepultura. Rocket 88. 
 Barcinski, André & Gomes, Silvio (1999). Sepultura: Toda a História. São Paulo: Ed. 34. 
 McIver, Joel (2008). The 100 Greatest Metal Guitarists. Jawbone Press. 
 Lemos, Anamaria (1993). Caos Desencanado. Bizz, 98, 40–45.
 Mudrian, Albert (2004). Choosing Death: the Improbable History of Death Metal and Grindcore. Los Angeles, CA: Feral House.
 Sepultura (1993). Chaos A.D. [CD]. New York, NY: Roadrunner Records.
 Sepultura Chaos A.D. (1994). Port Chester, NY: Cherry Lane Music.

Sepultura albums
Roadrunner Records albums
Epic Records albums
Albums produced by Andy Wallace (producer)
1993 albums
Albums with cover art by Michael Whelan
Albums recorded at Rockfield Studios